XEV Ltd (short for X-Electrical Vehicle) is an Italian-Hong Kong electric microcar manufacturer based in Hong Kong, operating since 2016.

History
In 2016, a Chinese engineer and entrepreneur, Tik Lou, engaged a team of native collaborators, as well as those experienced in, among others, in the then FCA group of designers. As a result, the automotive startup XEV was created, choosing Hong Kong as its headquarters, with a styling office located in Turin, Italy.

With the start of operations, XEV focused on the development of its project, an electric microcar with elements made in a 3D printer, collecting initial funding thanks to European funds. In 2019, the company announced that its vehicle would be manufactured at its newly acquired plant in Shanghai, China.

A pre-production XEV car was unveiled in December 2019, with plans to start series production in August 2020 if the necessary funds are raised through a crowdfunding campaign. The final model finally debuted in September 2021, in the same month not only going into production, but also having a world debut at the IAA 2021 show in Munich.

Models

Currently in production

 Yoyo
 Kitty

References

External links
 Official website

Motor vehicle manufacturers of Italy
Electric vehicle manufacturers of Italy
Companies of Hong Kong
Car brands